{{DISPLAYTITLE:C6H13NO3}}
The molecular formula C6H13NO3 (molar mass: 147.17 g/mol, exact mass: 147.0895 u) may refer to:

 Afegostat, also known as isofagomine
 Daunosamine

Molecular formulas